Cheqa Jangeh-ye Sofla (also Romanized as Cheqā Jangeh-ye Soflá and Cheqā Jengāh-e Soflá; also known as Chaqā Jangā-ye Soflá, Chegha Changa Sofla, and Cheqā Jengā-ye Soflá) is a village in Howmeh-ye Jonubi Rural District, in the Central District of Eslamabad-e Gharb County, Kermanshah Province, Iran. At the 2006 census, its population was 255, in 63 families.

References 

Populated places in Eslamabad-e Gharb County